Sir Henry Singer Keating (13 January 1804 – 1 October 1888) was a British lawyer and politician.
 
The son of Lieutenant General Sir Henry Sheehy Keating, he attended Trinity College Dublin and became a barrister at the Inner Temple in 1832, and a Queen's Counsel in 1849. He was Member of Parliament for Reading from 1852 until 1860 and as Solicitor General for England and Wales from 1857 to 1858 and in 1859.

He sat as a Judge of Common Pleas from 1859 to 1875. He became a member of the Privy Council in 1875, entitling him to sit on the Judicial Committee of the Privy Council, the court of last resort for the Empire.

Arms

References

External links 

1804 births
1888 deaths
Knights Bachelor
Alumni of Trinity College Dublin
UK MPs 1852–1857
UK MPs 1857–1859
UK MPs 1859–1865
Liberal Party (UK) MPs for English constituencies
Solicitors General for England and Wales
Justices of the Common Pleas
Members of the Judicial Committee of the Privy Council
Members of the Parliament of the United Kingdom for Reading
Burials at Kensal Green Cemetery
Members of the Privy Council of the United Kingdom